Star Marianas Air, Inc. is a U.S. commuter airline headquartered at Tinian International Airport in Tinian Municipality, Northern Mariana Islands. It operates scheduled and charter passenger service in the Commonwealth of the Northern Mariana Islands and Guam, both U.S. territories in the Pacific Ocean.

History
Star Marianas Air is named after four islands that constitute the Commonwealth of the Northern Mariana Islands, Saipan, Tinian, Aguigan, and Rota.

Star Mariana's Air was founded in 2008 and was approved by the FAA on April 1, 2009 to operate in the Northern Mariana Islands. The first flight took place on 2 April 2009 between the islands Tinian and Saipan with a Piper PA-32.

In 2010, three more Piper PA-32s were purchased, doubling the fleet from three to six aircraft. In 2013, the first of five Piper PA-31s was acquired and charter flights were added to the islands of Rota and Guam.

In June 2014, the airline was authorized by the FAA and the United States Department of Transportation to operate scheduled flights from Saipan Airport to Rota and Tinian Airports. Previously, there were only charter flights.

In 2016, the fleet was again expanded to seven Piper PA-32 and five Piper PA-31. In addition, since then an average of 200 flights per day are being carried out.

Destinations
Star Marianas Air flies to four destinations: Saipan International Airport, Rota International Airport, Antonio B. Won Pat International Airport (near Hagåtña, Guam), and Tinian International Airport.

Fleet

References

Airlines established in 2008
Airlines of the Northern Mariana Islands
2008 establishments in Oceania
Tinian
Regional airlines of the United States